Maratus felinus is a species of peacock spider native to Australia. It was discovered at Lake Jasper and Mount Romance along with two other species, Maratus aquilus and Maratus combustus.

Description 
Like other species of Maratus, males of the species are colorful and have a unique pattern. The species can be distinguished from other species by its atypical ovoid-shaped opisthosoma. According to researchers, the species is small and harmless.

References 

Spiders described in 2019
Spiders of Australia
Salticidae